Valaská Dubová is a village and municipality in Ružomberok District in the Žilina Region of northern Slovakia.

History
In historical records the village was first mentioned in 1322.

Geography
The municipality lies at an altitude of 649 metres and covers an area of 12.797 km². It has a population of about 770 people.

References

External links
http://www.statistics.sk/mosmis/eng/run.html

Villages and municipalities in Ružomberok District